Iron Throne may refer to:

 Iron Throne (A Song of Ice and Fire), the throne of the fictional monarchy of Westeros in the A Song of Ice and Fire novels and a metonym for the monarchy itself
 "The Iron Throne" (Game of Thrones), the final episode of Game of Thrones, the TV adaptation of A Song of Ice and Fire
 The Iron Throne (Birthright novel), a fantasy novel by Simon Hawke, set in the world of the Birthright
 The Iron Throne (Forgotten Realms), a fictional organization in the Forgotten Realms setting of Dungeons & Dragons

See also
György Dózsa on the iron throne, the 1514 execution of a Hungarian revolutionary
 Iron Crown (disambiguation)
 Iron Lady (disambiguation)
 Iron Lord (disambiguation)